The 1955 Florida International Twelve Hour Grand Prix of Endurance took place on 13 March, on the Sebring International Raceway (Florida, United States).  It was the second round of the F.I.A. World Sports Car Championship. For the fifth running of the event, the 5.2 mile course had been widened and smoothed with a new asphalt topping laid down. This was for safety and would allow the cars to achieve greater speed, especially in some of the corners.

Report

Entry

A massive total of 124 racing cars were registered for this event, of which 101 arrived for practice, trying to get among the 80 qualifiers for the race. Despite the size of the entry, the event was not supported by the major European teams, although there was one factory entry from England, for Donald Healey Motor Co., driven by Stirling Moss, who piloted an Osca to victory in 1954 with fellow Englishmen, Lance Macklin and two cars from France for Regie Renault Co., who include Robert Manzon amongst their squad. With no factory Ferrari entry to defend their championship lead, they were supported by the private entries of Allen Guiberson and Luigi Chinetti.

Briggs Cunningham returned after winning in 1954, with five cars from five different manufacturers. One of those cars was a factory-supported Jaguar D-Type for Phil Walters and Mike Hawthorn. Cunningham himself was entered in a new Offenhauser-powered Cunningham C-6R with John Gordon Bennett.

There were a dozen different countries represented in the field, including the teams from Mexico and Venezuela. The later had Chester "Chet" Flynn leading their effort, while the Mexicans had a two car team with Fred T. Van Beuren and Carlos Braniff leading their charge. The race saw its first Hollywood movie star, as Jackie Cooper was listed to pilot an Austin-Healey 100S.

Miss Isabelle Haskell was to become the first woman to complete, not only in the 12 Hours of Sebring – but in any American Automobile Association sanctioned race. Although the AAA did not allow ladies drivers, Haskell discovered that there was no such restriction placed on 'foreign races'. By race day, another woman had signed up to drive in the race, Greta Oakes was listed to take the wheel with her husband, Sydney Oakes.

Race

The race was held over 12 hours on the 5.2 miles Sebring International Raceway. An estimated 20,000 spectators showed on a warm and sunny raceday. With the race starting promptly at 10am, 80 cars scrambled for positions. Meanwhile, six drivers who were unhappy at not being allowed to start, decided to go on the track at the start, they did one or two laps and then got off the track. Statistics show that the Hawthorn/Walter's Jaguar D-Type led all but one of the 182 completed laps, That single lap, a Ferrari 750 Monza of Piero Taruffi and Harry Schell were able take to the front for lap 32.

As darkness fell on the former Hendricks Army Airfield, the race ended in confusion. At one point, the Ferrari of Phil Hill and Carroll Shelby were declared winners, then it was the D-Type. The Jag was called to the winner's circle, only to run out of fuel during the victory lap. The former Le Mans winner, Luigi Chinetti, the Ferrari representative from New York protested the result, which was counter-protected by the Jaguar owner, Briggs Cunningham. Cunningham insisted that the D-Type had passed the Ferrari. The owner of the Ferrari, Allen Guiberson demanded that the D-Type should be disqualified, as it passed the Ferrari under a yellow flag. Cunningham countered the Index of Performance Trophy should not have been handed to Hill/Shelby, when in fact it should have gone to the Osca driven by Bill Lloyd and George Huntoon.

The AAA contest board called a meeting on 21 March to make a final decision. They inspected the records of Cunningham and Guiberson, and that of race timekeeper, Joe Lane. The AAA declared the Jaguar had won by a margin of ten seconds. Although Cunningham had won the race, his protest was disallowed and Ferrari was ruled the handicap winners under the Index of Performance. This was due to an admission by Ferrari team chief, Nello Ugolini had forgotten to count a lap. As a result, Walters became the first driver to win the Grand Prix of Endurance twice – having co-driven a Cunningham-Chrysler C4-R to victory with John Fitch in the 1953 race.
 
The winning D-Type covered 182 laps (946.4 miles), averaging a speed of 79.300 mph. The podium was complete by William Spear's Maserati 300S, which he co-drove with Sherwood Johnston albeit two laps adrift. Elsewhere, Cooper managed to finish the race in 41st, Haskell did not. She went out with an apparent engine problem. The Oakes' Austin-Healey also failed to finish, after being involved in an accident.

Official Classification

Class Winners are in Bold text.

 Fastest Lap: Sherwood Johnston, 3:38.8secs (85.558 mph)

Class Winners

Standings after the race

Note: Only the top five positions are included in this set of standings.
Championship points were awarded for the first six places in each race in the order of 8-6-4-3-2-1. Manufacturers were only awarded points for their highest finishing car with no points awarded for positions filled by additional cars. Only the best 4 results out of the 6 races could be retained by each manufacturer. Points earned but not counted towards the championship totals are listed within brackets in the above table.

References

Further reading

Alec Ulmann. The Sebring Story. Chilton Book Company. ASIN B0006CUAP2.

12 Hours of Sebring
Sebring
Sebring
Sebring
Sebring